The Phantom of the Air is a 12-episode 1933 Pre-Code Universal film serial directed by Ray Taylor. The film stars Tom Tyler, who was cast most often in Westerns. Other actors include Gloria Shea, LeRoy Mason, Craig Reynolds and William Desmond.

Plot
Scientist Thomas Edmunds (William Desmond) and his daughter Mary (Gloria Shea) attend the National Air Races in Cleveland, Ohio to find a pilot. They select pilot Bob Raymond (Tom Tyler) from the U.S. Border Patrol, to demonstrate an anti-gravity device called the "Contragrav". At the air meet, Mortimer Crome (LeRoy Mason), a friend of Mary, is his main rival and has his henchman "Skip" (Walter Brennan) sabotage Raymond's aircraft prior to the air race. Raymond crashes but survives.

Edmunds' invention is sought after by a gang of smugglers led by Crome who owns the International Import & Export Company, who wants the invention. The inventor has a secret airfield in a desert region. Raymond comes to the inventor's aid, using another of Edwards' inventions, the superplane, the "Phantom." Able to control the aircraft remotely from an underground headquarters, Bob foils Crome's plans. Gloria has become Bob's love interest.

A last attempt to get at the inventor's work leads to an explosion at his workshop that kills the criminals. Edmunds escapes and is reunited with Gloria and Bob.

Chapter titles

 The Great Air Meet
 The Secret of the Desert
 The Avenging Phantom
 The Battle in the Clouds
 Terror of the Heights
 A Wild Ride
 The Jaws of Death
 Aflame in the Sky
 The Attack
 The Runaway Plane
 In the Enemy's Hands
 Safe Landing
Source:

Cast

 Tom Tyler as Captain Bob Raymond
 Gloria Shea as Mary Edmunds
 LeRoy Mason as Mort Crome, head of a gang of smugglers 
 Craig Reynolds as Blade, Raymonds' sidekick
 William Desmond as Mr Thomas Edmunds
 Sidney Bracey as Munsa
 Walter Brennan as "Skip"
 Jennie Cramer as Marie
 Cecil Kellogg as Joe
 Edmund Cobb as Bart, one of Crome's henchmen
 Bud Osborne as Spike, one of Crome's henchmen
 Nelson McDowell as Scotty
 Tom London as Jim
 Ethan Laidlaw as Durkin, one of Crome's henchmen
 Al Ferguson as Al, one of Crome's henchmen

Production
The numerous aircraft in The Phantom of the Air include:
 Travel Air 2000 c/n 456, NC4958 
 Travel Air B-4000 c/n 1177, NC631H 
 Travel Air 16K c/n 16K-2001, NR446W 
 Standard J-1 
 Curtiss JN-4 
 Stearman C3B 
 Emsco B7-C c/n 1, NC969-Y 
 Travel Air R Mystery Ship, R-2002, NR613K
 Wedell-Williams 44, c/n 109, NR61-Y

The race at the beginning of Chapter 1 in The Phantom of the Air was the 1932 Cleveland Air Race where Bob Raymond's Wedell-Williams Model 44 racer competed with Crome's Travel Air R Mystery Ship. The Edmunds "Phantom" was an Emsco B7-C, fitted with radio control.

Both Roscoe Turner and "Pancho" Barnes flew in the 1930 National Air Races in Chicago, and their aircraft appear in The Phantom of the Air.

Reception
Aviation historian Christian Santoir in Aeromovies described the impact of The Phantom of the Air as embodying the spirit of the early barnstorming era in Hollywood. "... several sequences of aerial stunts, realized, among others, by Art Goebel, Frank Clarke and Ivan Unger in the twenties. We thus witness the passage from one plane to another, the change of a wheel in full flight. We also go from an airplane to a car, from a fast boat to a plane, in the best tradition of 'stuntmen' in Hollywood."

References

Notes

Citations

Bibliography

 Cline, William C. "Filmography". In the Nick of Time. Jefferson, North Carolina: McFarland & Company, Inc., 1984. .
 Harmon, Jim and Donald F. Glut. The Great Movie Serials: Their Sound and Fury. London: Routledge, 1973. .
 Weiss, Ken and Ed Goodgold. To be Continued ...: A Complete Guide to Motion Picture Serials. New York: Bonanza Books, 1973. .
 Wynne, H. Hugh. The Motion Picture Stunt Pilots and Hollywood's Classic Aviation Movies. Missoula, Montana: Pictorial Histories Publishing Co., 1987. .

External links
 
 
 

1933 films
American aviation films
American black-and-white films
1930s English-language films
Universal Pictures film serials
Films directed by Ray Taylor
1933 adventure films
American action adventure films
1930s action films
Films with screenplays by George H. Plympton
1930s American films